Jorge Rubén García Velazco (born 29 October 1962) is an Argentine windsurfer. He competed at the 1984 Summer Olympics and the 1988 Summer Olympics.

Notes

References

External links
 
 

1962 births
Living people
Argentine windsurfers
Argentine male sailors (sport)
Olympic sailors of Argentina
Sailors at the 1984 Summer Olympics – Windglider
Sailors at the 1988 Summer Olympics – Division II
Place of birth missing (living people)